Circassian paganism, also called Khabzeism or Khabzism, is the ethnic religion of the Circassian people. It is based on worshipping the one major god, "Thashxwe" (or just "Tha"), and other minor deities under his rule, to each of whom is attributed an element, action or item of veneration and control. The religion also strongly focuses on the perfection of the soul, developing spiritual maturity and honour until a practitioner may enter the heavens, in union with their ancestors.

Concepts and values 

The prominent concepts of Khabzeism include honour (nape), manifestation of compassion (guschlegu), gratuitous help (psape), which, along with valour, and the bravery of a warrior, enable the human soul to join the soul of the ancestors with a clear conscience (nape huzhkle). Thereby, the goal of man's earthly existence is the perfection of the soul; the souls of the ancestors also require commemoration, for they ability to observe and evaluate the affairs of their descendants: funeral feasts are arranged (hedeus) and sacrifice or memorial meal preparations (zheryme) are practiced and distributed for the remembrance of the dead souls.

Nape 
Nape (honour) is one of the cornerstones of the Circassian faith. Since Circassia traditionally possessed no prisons and no corporal punishment, a system of fines, the death penalty or expulsion from society were utilised instead; however, the most terrible punishment amongst them was to “lose face” (napeteh), and therefore respect for and from society, a fate considered worse than death. Napeteh was cast often by military defeat or imprisonment at the hands of a foreign army, and it subsequently became a custom for Circassian warriors to commit honor suicide.

Guschlegu 
Guschlegu (compassion) entails hospitality and care for others. It is considered highly important in Circassian society, where it often connects to the concept of honour, inasmuch as demonstrations of goodwill and beneficence are valued and considered, especially in more traditional communities, to be almost socially obligatory.

Psape 
Psape (gratuitous help) is much the same concept as guschlegu, but differs in that psape refers to actions of help without expectation of anything in return. Circassians, according to the Adyghe Xabze, are for example expected to welcome guests as their own family, and to make provisions for them; a good host should also never expect repayment for his actions, though the social code also obliges guests to act beneath the authority of their host for as long as their stay welcomes them.

Offerings and rituals 
It is quite probable that at one time the Circassians had a separate priestly caste that officiated religious services and rites. However, there are no indications that arcane sects nor a power wielding priestly class jealously guarding hidden mysteries inaccessible to the common folk, as was the case in various ancient societies, ever existed; the oldest partaker, who passed on the knowledge to his lay disciples, usually performs religious rites.

It is believed that performance of special rites of worship, in which supplicants encircle a venerated object (like a holy tree, or a spot stricken by lightning) invoke the resident spirits and unlocked their latent powers. Some accounts tell of solemn processions round a tree with the supplicants carrying torches; these rituals formed a significant part of a complex system of prayers. The most sacred class of dances was called wij (x’wrey), which is performed by dancers, forming a circle round a venerated object.

Religious rites are sometimes accompanied by chanting. Songs were intoned during feasts in honour of thunder, during sacrifices, and amongst other traditional festivals. When lightning struck a place or an object, a special kind of wij was performed round the stricken spot accompanied by the Song of Lightning (Schible Wered).

Another class of rites of supplication is concerned with prevention of disease; a primitive form of inoculation existed amongst the ancient Circassians in prevention of smallpox, and such an inoculation would be followed by placement in a swing, rocked to the accompaniment of a special chant, Your Lordship (Ziywis-hen), which invoked the mercy of the deity of the disease.

Alongside religious rites may be provided oaths and vows, wherein violation would lead to contempt and shame, and traditionally often retribution by the community.

Beliefs and Creation 
The Khabzeist faith is monistic, with utmost prominence given to the god Tha (Тхьэ, tħa), Theshxwe, who begets the universe. First of all, Tha expresses himself generating the Word or cosmic Law (khy), the primordial pattern from which all the beings form naturally, developing by internal laws. Enlightenment for men corresponds to an understanding of Tha's Law.

Theshxwe is omnipresent in his creation (coagulation); according to Adyghe cosmological texts, "his spirit is scattered throughout space". In Adyghe hymns Tha (Thashxue) is referred to as "the One everyone asks, but who doesn't ask back", "the multiplier of the non-existent", "on whom everyone places their hope, but who doesn’t place hope on anyone", "from whom the gifts come", "His amazing work", "the One who permits heaven and earth to move".
	 
Everything is one (Псори Зыщ, Psora Zysch, or Псори Хыщ, Psora Hysch), and is one with the Tha. The material-manifested world is in perpetual change, but at the same time there is a foundation that always remains unshaken. That is the originating principle of the world and its Law. The always-changing world and its basis is compared to a rotating wheel (дунейр шэрхъщи duneyr sherhschi, мэкlэрахъуэ meklerahue): although the wheel is constantly rotating (changing), the central hub, about which it rotates, remains still. Followers of this worldview, sometimes also Islamised, are found in modern day Turkey.

Secondary Deities 
After Tha, the supreme god, there are secondary deities, such as:

 Hantseguash: The Goddess of Water and Rain
 Hedrixe: the God and Protector of the Dead
 Heneguash: The Goddess of Sea
 Hyateguash: the Goddess of Beauty and Gardens
 Kodes: The God of Mountains
 Mezguash: The Goddess of all Fauna
 Mezytha: The God of Forests, Hunt and Beasts
 Psetha: The God of Life and Souls
 Sataney: The Goddess of Femininity and Fertility, Mother of the Narts
 Schyble: The God of Lightning
 Sozresh: The God of Fertility, Family, Wellbeing and Illness
 Thageledj: The God of Flora and Crops
 Tlepsh: The God of Fire, Blacksmiths, Steel and Weapons
 Theshu: The God and Protector of Horsemen
 Theqwafeshu: The Herald of Theshxwe
 Tetertup: The God of War and Bloodshed
 Uashkhue: The God of the Skies
 Merise: The Goddess and Protectress of Bees
 The Narts, demigods mentioned in the eponymous Saga with their mother Sataney.

Various other deities are believed exist as well, with extensive regional and universal pantheons.

The gods and goddesses are divided into two fundamentally different groups:
 
Gods without image, cosmogonic (Thashkhue, Uashkhue, Psetha, Schyble).
Anthropomorphic (humanoid) gods (Mezytha, Tlepsh, Thagaledj, etc.).

Continuity
Circassia was one of the few places in Europe that retained its native religious traditions for the longest time, with almost a continuity between the ancient traditions and the modern religiosity and world-view (Xabze), which syncrethized and maintained many of its native elements even in Islamic times. The Xabze beliefs and Sufi-Islamic beliefs are currently seen as complementary philosophies by some Circassians.

Sources 

Paganism
Circassians